The Omaha Ak-Sar-Ben Knights were a professional ice hockey team in the American Hockey League. They played in Omaha, Nebraska, United States at the Omaha Civic Auditorium from 2005–07. Following the 2006–07 season, the Calgary Flames announced that the team would relocate to the Quad Cities for 2007–08.

History
In 2005, the AHL franchise of the Calgary Flames (the Saint John Flames, which existed from 1993 to 2003) was reestablished in Omaha. The Ak-Sar-Ben part of the team's name comes from the Knights of Ak-Sar-Ben, an Omaha civic organization, whose logo was integrated into the insignia of the team and was a partner with the Omaha organization. Ak-Sar-Ben, which is "Nebraska" spelled backwards, was also the name of the arena of the original Omaha Knights. The team logo was shown with identical flame marks as the Calgary Flames' logo.

Following two difficult seasons at the gate, rumors swirled around both Omaha and the Quad Cities that the Flames would relocate their affiliate to the latter region, which was at the time served by the Quad City Mallards of the United Hockey League. The Calgary Flames and Quad City Mallards confirmed the move on May 24, 2007.

Season-by-season record

Team records

Single season
Goals: 28, Carsen Germyn (2006–07)
Assists: 43, Andrei Taratukhin (2006–07)
Points: 60, Dustin Boyd, Carsen Germyn, and Andrei Taratukhin (2006–07)
Penalty minutes: 294, Brandon Prust (2005–06)
Plus/minus: +27, David Van Der Gulik (2006–07)
Wins: 35, Curtis McElhinney (2006–07)
Shutouts: 7, Curtis McElhinney (2006–07)
GAA: 2.13, Curtis McElhinney (2006–07)
SV%: .917, Curtis McElhinney (2006–07)

Career
Career goals: 52, Carsen Germyn
Career assists: 63, Carsen Germyn
Career points: 115, Carsen Germyn
Career penalty minutes: 505, Brandon Prust
Career goaltending wins: 44, Curtis McElhinney 
Career shutouts: 10, Curtis McElhinney
Career games: 156, Warren Peters

Team captains
Craig MacDonald 2005–06
No captain; (Carsen Germyn, Warren Peters, and Brad Ference served as alternates) 2006–07

See also
 Sports in Omaha, Nebraska

References

 
Calgary Flames minor league affiliates
Sports in Omaha, Nebraska
Ice hockey clubs established in 2005
Ice hockey clubs disestablished in 2007
Ice hockey teams in Nebraska
2005 establishments in Nebraska
2007 disestablishments in Nebraska